Heslop-Harrison is a surname, and can be:
George Heslop-Harrison (1911–1964), British entomologist
Jack Heslop-Harrison (1920–1998), British botanist
John William Heslop-Harrison (1881–1967), British academic

See also
Heslop
Harrison (name)

Compound surnames
English-language surnames
Surnames of English origin